Jan-Eric Gustafsson (born 1949) is a Swedish educational psychologist. He is professor of education at the University of Gothenburg and professor II at the University of Oslo's Faculty of Educational Sciences. He was named a member of the Royal Swedish Academy of Sciences in 1993 and received an honorary doctorate from the University of Oslo in 2017.

References

External links
Faculty page

Living people
Swedish psychologists
Educational psychologists
People from Falköping Municipality
University of Gothenburg alumni
Academic staff of the University of Gothenburg
Members of the Royal Swedish Academy of Sciences
1949 births